The Finnish Artillery Regiment, designated A 4, was an artillery regiment of the Swedish Army, that traced its origins back to the 17th century. It was disbanded in 1811. The regiment's soldiers were recruited from Finland, and it was also garrisoned there.

History 

The regiment has its origins in the Artillery Regiment raised in 1636. That regiment was split into four new regiments in 1794 of which the Finnish Artillery Regiment was one. It was mainly garrisoned in Helsinki. Part of the regiment was transferred to Sweden and was garrisoned in Gävle as the Former Finnish Artillery Regiment after the Finnish War in 1809. The regiment was then disbanded two years later in 1811 when two companies were incorporated into Svea Artillery Regiment and three companies were incorporated into Wendes Artillery Regiment.

The present-day Artillery Brigade of the Finnish Defence Forces considers itself a successor unit of the Finska artilleriregementet.

Campaigns 

?

Organisation 

?

Name, designation and garrison

See also 
List of Swedish regiments
Provinces of Sweden

References 
Print

Online

Further reading  
 
 

Artillery regiments of the Swedish Army
Military units and formations established in 1794
1794 establishments in Sweden
Military units and formations disestablished in 1811
Expatriate military units and formations
Military history of Finland